Papusza is 2013 Polish feature film directed by Joanna Kos-Krauze and Krzysztof Krauze, starring Jowita Budnik as lead actress.

The plot revolves around the biography of  Romani poetess Bronisława Wajs, better known as Papusza (rom. Lalka) within the Romani community. The film is black and white, with dialogue mainly in Romani.

Cast 
The cast is as follows:
 Jowita Budnik as Papusza (Bronisława Wajs)
 Zbigniew Waleryś as Dionizy Wajs
 Antoni Pawlicki as Jerzy Ficowski
 Andrzej Walden as Julian Tuwim
 Sebastian Wesołowski as Tarzan, son of Papusza
 Paloma Mirga as young Papusza
 Artur Steranko as „lieutenant” Czarnecki
 Karol Parno Gierliński as Śero Rom (Roma leader)
 Jerzy Gudejko as minister

Reception

Awards 
The film received several awards at national and international film festivals of 2013:
 Gdynia Film Festival – "Golden Kittens" award of the youth city council; best supporting actor (Zbigniew Waleryś); best makeup (Anna Nobel-Nobielska); best score (Jan Kanty Pawluśkiewicz)
 Karlovy Vary International Film Festival – special jury award
 "Manaki Brothers" International Film Festival – „Bronze Camera 300” award (Krzysztof Ptak and Wojciech Staroń)
 "Tadeusz Szymkow" Film Festival – "Golden Puppy" award for best supporting actor (Zbigniew Waleryś)
 Valladolid International Film Festival – young jury's award; best director (Joanna Kos-Krauze and Krzysztof Krauze); best actor (Zbigniew Waleryś)
 Thessaloniki International Film Festival – "Open Horizons" award

References

External links 
 Papusza on Filmweb
 

Polish black-and-white films
Polish biographical films
2013 films
2010s Polish-language films
2010s biographical films
Romani-language films
2013 multilingual films
Polish multilingual films